DAU. Natasha is a 2020 Russian-language internationally co-produced drama film directed by Ilya Khrzhanovsky and Jekaterina Oertel. It was selected to compete for the Golden Bear in the main competition section at the 70th Berlin International Film Festival. At Berlin, the film won the Silver Bear for an Outstanding Artistic Contribution.

Cast
 Natalia Berezhnaya as Natasha
 Olga Shkabarnya as Olga
 Vladimir Azhippo as Azhippo
 Alexei Blinov as Prof. Blinov

Production
The film took 15 years to produce and utilized hundreds of actors. The Guardian likened the film to a real world implementation of Synecdoche, New York.

See also
 DAU (project)
 Dau (film)

References

External links
 
 

Dau (project)
2020 films
2020 drama films
2020s Russian-language films
Russian drama films
Silver Bear for outstanding artistic contribution
Films set in Kharkiv
Films shot in Kharkiv